Jari Nurminen (born 10 November 1961) is a Finnish racing driver from Helsinki.

Racing career

Formula cars
Nurminen began his racing career racing Formula Vee cars in his native Finland. In 1983 he finished 3rd in the Finnish Formula Three Championship and competed in four races of the German Formula Three Championship. In 1984 and 1985 he finished fifth in German F3 in back-to-back years, capturing his first win in 1985. In 1986 he competed in a full season of International Formula 3000 with the EuroVenturini team but only managed to qualify for one of the eleven races, the season opener at Brands Hatch and also did some tests for the Arrows Formula One team. Despite the disastrous 1986 campaign, Nurminen returned to the team and series in 1987. After failing to qualify for three of the first four races he switched teams to GA Motorsports where he qualified for four of the next six races, scoring a best finish of 15th at Österreichring. He returned to the series in 1988 and drove a full season for Colt Racing. He qualified for all but two of the races and finished 7th at the Birmingham Superprix, just one spot out of the points.

Sports cars
In 1989 he moved to sports car racing in the World Sports-Prototype Championship, making 10 starts in 1989 and 1990. Nurminen was out of racing until 1997 when he competed in three FIA GT Championship races and the 1997 24 Hours of Le Mans in the Chamberlain Engineering Chrysler Viper GTS-R which finished sixth in class and 15th overall in an attrition-filled race. From 2002 to 2005 Nurminen drove in a number of low-profile Finnish series such as the Yaris Cup and Legends Trophy. From 2006 to 2008 he competed in the Scandinavian Ferrari Challenge series, winning the title in 2007. In 2009 he brought his Ferrari F430 Challenge to the Finnish GT3 Championship where he finished fifth in points in 2009 and fourth in 2010. For 2011 he moved to the Swedish Camaro Cup series, where he remains in 2012.

References

1961 births
Finnish racing drivers
International Formula 3000 drivers
German Formula Three Championship drivers
24 Hours of Le Mans drivers
FIA GT Championship drivers
Sportspeople from Helsinki
Living people
24 Hours of Spa drivers